Afrotaenia is a monotypic genus of centipedes with only one species, Afrotaenia machadoi. It is found in Angola. This species is about 2 cm in length with about 59 pairs of legs.

References 

Ballophilidae
Centipede genera
Monotypic arthropod genera